The American stock car racing category NASCAR raced in Australia from the late 1980s to the early 2000s. After strong initial interest, particularly in Melbourne at Australia's only purpose-built NASCAR style paved oval speedway, the Calder Park Thunderdome, the category collapsed in the early 2000s and has defied several attempts to revive it since then.

History 
Bringing NASCAR to Australia was the creation of four-time Australian Touring Car Championship and Bathurst 500 winner, Bob Jane, whose personal A$54m investment created the Thunderdome at the Calder Park Raceway, modelled on a scaled-down version of the Charlotte Motor Speedway. Australian NASCAR racing was sanctioned by Jane's Australian Stock Car Auto Racing (AUSCAR) authority on behalf of NASCAR in America but the relationship between the two was tenuous, and drifted over time. AUSCAR was also the name of the second tier category with cars based on the Australian made Holden Commodore and Ford Falcon running 5.0L V8 engines.

In 1987 with the completion of the Calder Park Thunderdome extensions the much delayed first NASCAR race late in the 1987 racing season with the first major event, the 1988 Goodyear NASCAR 500 following on February 28, 1988. Initially Winston Cup drivers such as Neil Bonnett, Bobby Allison, Michael Waltrip, Dave Marcis and Kyle Petty visited the Thunderdome but interest waned over time and big name guest drivers were lured from circuit racing to bolster fields. Star touring car drivers Allan Grice and Dick Johnson were both early supporters of the concept, with both travelling to the US to race in the Winston Cup Series, although success was limited. Another touring car star in Kiwi Jim Richards also raced successfully in NASCAR in Australia.

Like in the United States, many of the NASCAR drivers in Australia came from the ranks of dirt track speedway, with drivers such as Barry Graham, Gene Cook, Robin Best, George Elliot, Terry Byers, Neville Lance, Terry Wyhoon, Todd Wanless, and Max Dumesny all being regulars in the series. NASCAR, like the AUSCAR series, also attracted a number of touring car drivers such as Charlie O'Brien, Greg Murphy, Russell Ingall, and the final ever series champion Andrew Miedecke. Other drivers included Bob Jane's son Rodney Jane and his nephew Kim Jane (his brother's son) who were also race winners in both AUSCAR and NASCAR, and in the case of Kim Jane a four time NASCAR series champion. NASCAR in Australia also saw a number of drivers successfully move from AUSCAR, including Brad Jones who won five straight AUSCAR titles before winning his first series in NASCAR, and John Faulkner.

As popular V8 powered sedans became less successful in the Australian Touring Car Championship due to Group A being dominated by imported turbocharged cars such as the Ford Sierra RS500 and various Nissan Skylines, NASCAR arrived in Australia at exactly the right time to exploit a dissatisfaction within Australian race fans and crowds were initially promising, although they faded. The installation of lights at the Thunderdome for night racing in 1991 brought crowds back to peak levels and for the next five years enjoyed success. This success was limited though with only one circuit available.

In 1990 the 1/2 mile (805 metre) Speedway Super Bowl at the eastern end of the Bob Jane owned Adelaide International Raceway also saw NASCAR racing, giving the category the chance to run on both a high banked speedway and a traditional flat short track. The slower Super Bowl was a welcome addition to the series as it offered a new challenge with its short straights and much tighter turns which unlike the 24° banking at the Dome that allowed for high speed, was only 7° at AIR. When compared to the much faster Thunderdome, the Bowl earned the reputation of a bull-ring (NASCAR's lapped the Thunderdome at over  while lapping Adelaide at around ). NASCAR continued to run a single round of the series in Adelaide until the series folded in 2001. In 1992, plans were announced by Bob Jane and Channel 7 in Sydney (with help from speedway promoter and Seven's lead motor racing commentator Mike Raymond) to turn the 1/2 mile long trotting track at the Granville Showground that surrounded Sydney's Parramatta Speedway into a banked paved oval, thus giving a third oval track for the series to use. However, the plans never got past the planning stage.

The Australian NASCARs were supporters of the Gold Coast Indy 300 run by CART on the Surfers Paradise Street Circuit during the early years when CAMS sanctioned categories ignored the race meeting in 1992 giving the category its first run on a road course in Australia. NASCARs only other regular stop became Sydney's Oran Park Raceway from the mid-1990s, with the cars ran under lights and utilised the shorter 1.96 km road course rather than the 2.6 km Grand Prix circuit. Throughout its run in Australia, NASCAR never ventured west of Adelaide and never went off the mainland which limited its audience (though this didn't stop Tasmanian drivers from competing, such as the winner of the first two Australian championships, Robin Best).

It was at Oran Park in 1995 where 1993 500cc Grand Prix motorcycle World Champion, American Kevin Schwantz, made his NASCAR debut. Schwantz won that race at Oran Park driving a Chevrolet Lumina and later went on to be a regular in the NASCAR Busch Series in the United States, chose to "cut his teeth" in the more relaxed Australian championship to gain valuable experience rather than jump straight into the cut and thrust of the more professional American series.

By the end of the 1990s popularity had fallen below viability, and with major sponsors favouring the heavily televised V8 Supercars, the series moved to an exclusively road course calendar when NASCAR parted company with founder Bob Jane and thus the only paved speedways in Australia, the Thunderdome and AIRs Super Bowl. Rebadged as V8 Stock Cars, the series lasted a single full season on the 2001 Power Tour before grid numbers dropped to the point where completing the 2002 season was no longer viable. The 2001 season was a road race series with races at Mallala, Queensland Raceway, Oran Park (twice), Winton, with the final round on the Calder Park road course.

The 2002 season was abandoned after races were held at Mallala, Oran Park and Queensland Raceway, Andrew Miedecke was leading the championship after Queensland Raceway.

Stock Cars Australia is currently holding stock car races in Australia and they race at locations such as Wakefield Park, Sydney Motorsport Park and Winton Raceway using a combination of Cup cars, Xfinity Series cars, OzTrucks and GTA's, Brett Mitchell was the 2019 Champion.

While most of the cars used were those seen in America at the time such as the Chevrolet Monte Carlo, Chevrolet Lumina, Ford Thunderbird, Oldsmobile Cutlass, Oldsmobile Delta 88, Buick LeSabre, and Pontiac Grand Prix, locally developed Holden Commodore's and Ford Falcon's were also raced with Allan Grice notably driving a VN Commodore to several wins in 1990, while Jim Richards also raced an EA Falcon with some success.

This compared to the Australian-based AUSCAR's (which while also using smaller V8 engines, ran on road tyres rather than racing slicks) which had a top speed of approximately ).

Champions

References

1980s in Australia
Australia
1990s in Australia
Australia
2000s in Australia
Australia
Motorsport categories in Australia